Pata or PATA may refer to:

Places
 Pata, Sulu, a Philippine municipality
 Pata, Galanta District, a village in Slovakia
 Pata, Central African Republic, a village
 Pata village (Samoa), a village in Samoa
 Pontrilas Army Training Area, a British Army training camp in England
 Provincially Administered Tribal Areas, tribal areas administered by Khyber-Pakhtunkhwa province of Pakistan
 Pata, a village in Apahida Commune, Romania
 Pata island, in the Faichuk group of islands, Micronesia

Other uses
 Parallel ATA, an obsolete computer interface for hard disk drive, optical disc drive, and/or solid-state drive
 Pata (sword), an Indian weapon
 Pata (musician), a Japanese guitarist
 Pacific Asia Travel Association
 Ralph M. Calhoun Memorial Airport, Alaska, by ICAO location indicator
 PATA, a Latvian company
 PATA, Finnish esports team

See also
 Patach, a Hebrew niqqud vowel sign
 Patas, a species of monkey
 Patta (disambiguation)